Theodoros Pangalos can refer to:
 Theodoros Pangalos (general) (1878–1952), Greek general, dictator in 1925–26
 Theodoros Pangalos (politician) (born 1938), Greek politician, foreign minister and deputy prime minister of Greece